The 2017 Buffalo Bills season was the franchise's 58th overall season, 48th in the National Football League and third full season under the ownership of Terry and Kim Pegula. The season was the first under the leadership of general manager Brandon Beane and head coach Sean McDermott. On December 31, 2017, the final week of the regular season, the Bills finally ended what would have been their 18-year playoff drought (previously the longest active drought in the NFL and the longest active playoff drought among the four major professional North American sport leagues) with the Bills winning 22–16 over the Dolphins and the Cincinnati Bengals upsetting the Baltimore Ravens 31–27. The Bills also improved on their 7–9 record from 2016 and clinched their first winning season since 2014 (when Doug Marrone was head coach). However, the #6 seed Bills lost the Wild Card game against the #3 seed Jacksonville 10–3, extending their playoff victory drought to 22 years.

Offseason
Beane joined the Bills after 19 seasons with the Carolina Panthers, the last two as assistant to then-general manager Dave Gettleman. Beane, who signed an undisclosed deal on May 9, 2017, replaced Doug Whaley, who was fired by Pegula after the 2017 NFL Draft. Whaley was fired, along with the team's entire scouting staff, on April 30, 2017, less than 12 hours after the conclusion of the 2017 NFL Draft. Over the course of the 2016 offseason and into the 2017 season, many of Whaley's draft picks were purged from the roster in trades and cuts. Of the 28 players Whaley had drafted from 2014 to 2017, only nine were still on the roster by the end of August. The 2017 season was also the first under McDermott, who spent the previous eight seasons as defensive coordinator, the last six with the Panthers. McDermott, who signed an undisclosed deal on January 11, 2017, replaced Rex Ryan, who was fired along with his twin brother Rob on December 27, 2016.

Transactions

Coaching and front office changes

Coaching staff

Front office

Roster changes

Arrivals

Departures

Trades

Cuts

Retirements

Draft

Notes
The Bills sent their 2017 first-round pick (10th overall), later revealed to be Patrick Mahomes, to the Kansas City Chiefs in order to trade down during the 2017 draft and select Tre'Davious White 27th overall. The Bills acquired an additional third-round selection (91st overall), later revealed to be John Johnson—who was traded, along with their original second-round selection (44th overall), later revealed to be Gerald Everett, to the Los Angeles Rams in order to trade up and select Zay Jones 37th overall—an additional fifth-round selection (149th overall), later revealed to be Damontae Kazee—who was traded to the Atlanta Falcons along with the Bills third round pick and another fifth rounder for the Falcons second-round selection (63rd overall), later revealed to be Dion Dawkins. The Bills sent their 2016 second-round pick (49th overall), fourth-round pick and 2017 fourth-round pick (both 117th overall), later revealed to be Jarran Reed, Pharoh Cooper and Josh Reynolds, respectively, to the Chicago Bears in order to trade up during the 2016 draft and select Reggie Ragland 41st overall (Reynolds was later traded to the Rams). The Bills acquired a fifth-round selection (163rd overall), later revealed to be Matt Milano, as part of a trade that sent Mike Gillislee to the New England Patriots. The Bills acquired a fifth-round selection (171st overall), later revealed to be Nathan Peterman, as part of a trade that sent their seventh-round pick (228th overall), later revealed to be Joey Ivie, along with Matt Cassel, to the Dallas Cowboys.

Undrafted free agents

Staff

Final roster

Preseason

Regular season

Schedule

Note: Intra-division opponents are in bold text.

Game summaries

Week 1: vs. New York Jets

With the defending Super Bowl champion New England Patriots losing 42–27 to the Kansas City Chiefs to kick off the 2017 NFL season and Hurricane Irma delaying the game between the Miami Dolphins and the Tampa Bay Buccaneers to Week 11, the Bills hoped to take advantage and grab first place in the AFC East by beating the Jets, who swept them in 2016. Quarterback Tyrod Taylor threw 1-yard touchdown passes to both tight end Charles Clay and wide receiver Andre Holmes, while fullback Mike Tolbert rushed for a third touchdown. With Tolbert's score, the Bills recorded a rushing touchdown in 13 straight games, tying a team record set in 1980 and extending the longest active streak in the NFL. Safeties Jordan Poyer and Micah Hyde both got their first takeaways as Bills in the fourth quarter, with Hyde's interception ending any hope of a Jets rally. With the win, the Bills opened the season at 1–0 and in first place in the AFC East heading into their Week 2 matchup with head coach Sean McDermott's former team, the Carolina Panthers.

Week 2: at Carolina Panthers

Looking for their first 2–0 start since 2014, the Bills traveled to Bank of America Stadium for an inter-conference matchup with the Panthers. Many former Panthers players and personnel made their return to Carolina as members of the Bills, including fullback Mike Tolbert, cornerback Leonard Johnson, wide receiver Kaelin Clay, general manager Brandon Beane and head coach Sean McDermott. Unfortunately, despite the defense sacking Panthers quarterback Cam Newton six times and only allowing three field goals from Graham Gano, the Bills offense could not take advantage, only managing a 45-yard field goal from Steven Hauschka in the fourth quarter, the team's lowest points since losing 45–3 to the San Francisco 49ers in 2012. A potential game-winning touchdown pass from quarterback Tyrod Taylor to rookie WR Zay Jones on 4th-and-11 with 9 seconds remaining sailed off Jones’ fingertips, putting the game away for the Panthers. The Bills fell to 1–1 with the loss.

Week 3: vs. Denver Broncos

Following a close loss to the Panthers, the Bills returned home to host the Denver Broncos. Despite running back LeSean McCoy only amassing 21 rushing yards, the Bills still managed to score with quarterback Tyrod Taylor passing for 213 yards and two touchdowns and kicker Steven Hauschka kicking four field goals, including two from beyond 50 yards. The Bills defense intercepted quarterback Trevor Siemian twice as the team won a close-fought game 26–16. An unsportsmanlike-conduct penalty against linebacker Von Miller allowed the Bills to continue a stalled drive in the fourth quarter and ice the game with Hauschka's fourth field goal. With the win, the Bills improved to 2–1 heading into their Week 4 matchup against the defending NFC Champion Atlanta Falcons.

Prior to the game, several members of both teams knelt during the national anthem in the wake of President Donald Trump's comments regarding NFL players who protested.

Week 4: at Atlanta Falcons

Looking to continue their winning ways after upsetting the Broncos the previous week, the Bills traveled to Atlanta to take on the Atlanta Falcons, who made it to the Super Bowl the previous season, as fullback Patrick DiMarco made his first return to Atlanta since signing with the Bills in free agency. The Bills defense held the Falcons in check for most of the game and tight end Charles Clay recorded his first 100-yard receiving game since 2015. A key highlight was a fumble from Falcons quarterback Matt Ryan that arguably looked like a forward pass, but was ruled a fumble and returned for a 52-yard touchdown by rookie cornerback Tre'Davious White. With the win, the Bills improve to 3–1 for the first time since 2011 and regained sole possession of first place in the AFC East with the Patriots losing 33–30 to the Panthers, but lost starting receiver Jordan Matthews and starting linebacker Ramon Humber to multi-week thumb injuries.

Week 5: at Cincinnati Bengals

Looking to continue their winning ways after upsetting the Falcons the week prior, the Bills traveled down to Cincinnati to take on the Bengals, who got their first win of the season when they defeated their rival Cleveland Browns 31–7 the previous week. Already missing wideout Jordan Matthews, the Bills offense sputtered for the most part after tight end Charles Clay suffered a knee injury in the second quarter and was ruled out the rest of the game. The Bengals rallied behind strong performances from quarterback Andy Dalton and receiver A. J. Green despite the duo committing three turnovers, and won a close-fought game in the rain 20–16. With the loss, Buffalo fell to 3–2 going into their bye week.

Week 7: vs. Tampa Bay Buccaneers

Fresh off their bye week, the Bills returned home to host the Tampa Bay Buccaneers. LeSean McCoy scored his first two touchdowns of the season as the Bills won a shootout match 30–27, with their final 10 points coming in the last three minutes of the game. With Tampa Bay taking the lead after forcing McCoy to fumble and capitalizing with a Mike Evans touchdown pass from Jameis Winston, Tyrod Taylor led the Bills 75 yards downfield, connecting with newly signed receiver Deonte Thompson for 44 yards to help set up McCoy's second touchdown. Tre'Davious White then forced the Buccaneers to fumble on their ensuing drive, setting up Steven Hauschka's game winning field goal. The Bills improve to 4–2 with the win.

Note: Former Bills Garrison Sanborn and Ryan Fitzpatrick made their first return to New Era Field since signing with the Buccaneers in free agency.

Week 8: vs. Oakland Raiders

The Bills hosted the Oakland Raiders in week 8. This was the first week they were without All-Pro defensive lineman Marcell Dareus, who was traded to the Jacksonville Jaguars for a sixth-round draft pick just two days prior to the game. Nonetheless, the defense was still able to limit a potent Raiders offense to just 14 points, causing four turnovers in the process. LeSean McCoy led the team with over 180 yards from scrimmage and rookie linebacker Matt Milano also scored off a fumble recovery. With the win, the Bills improved to 5–2 for the third time since 2008.

Week 9: at New York Jets

Coming off the convincing win against Oakland, the Bills traveled to New York for a Thursday Night rematch against their division rivals, the New York Jets. Though heavily favored to win, the Bills played poorly on defense and allowed the Jets to run for 194 yards and three rushing touchdowns. The offense surrendered three fumbles which ultimately influenced the course of the game, despite receivers Zay Jones and Deonte Thompson catching their first touchdowns as members of the Bills. With the loss, the Bills fell to 5–3.

Week 10: vs. New Orleans Saints

For the second consecutive week, the Bills run defense under-performed, allowing 296 rushing yards and six rushing touchdowns against the New Orleans Saints. To make matters worse, the offense was unable to stay on the field, attaining only five first downs and a field goal prior to rookie quarterback Nathan Peterman replacing Tyrod Taylor late in the fourth quarter. With the blowout loss, the Bills fall to 5–4.

Week 11: at Los Angeles Chargers

Nathan Peterman started in Tyrod Taylor's place. Peterman was benched at halftime after going 6 of 14 for 66 yards with 5 interceptions.

Week 12: at Kansas City Chiefs

After consecutive weeks of playing bad defense, the Bills were finally able to rebound, holding Kansas City to just 10 points as Tyrod Taylor returned to the starting lineup on offense. Tre'Davious White sealed the win for Buffalo in the fourth quarter with an interception off Chiefs quarterback Alex Smith. With the win, the Bills snap their three-game losing streak and improve to 6–5.

Week 13: vs. New England Patriots

Though Buffalo was able to hold the potent New England Patriots offense to just nine first-half points, it was not enough to beat them, as the Patriots won 23–3. Multiple Bills starters were injured, including Tyrod Taylor and Shaq Lawson. Perhaps the defining moment of the game occurred in the fourth quarter, when Tre'Davious White intercepted a pass intended for Rob Gronkowski. Upset that no pass interference penalty was called on White, Gronkowski reacted by jumping elbow-first onto White, who was still on the ground. The play resulted in White landing on the concussion protocol and Gronkowski receiving a one-game suspension as a result of his actions.

Week 14: vs. Indianapolis Colts

The game against Indianapolis, called the "Snow Bowl" by the media, was notable for being held in the midst of a lake-effect snow storm that left over a foot of snow on the stadium's turf. The heavy snow and strong winds caused severe complications, making it difficult for CBS to televise the game due to low visibility and prompting both teams to run the ball far more often and make more fourth-down conversion attempts than would otherwise have been attempted, since kicking the ball was less reliable. The amount of snow on the ground did prove to be an advantage for the punters, since the ball did not bounce upon landing, making precision coffin corner punts easier. Nathan Peterman made his second start with Tyrod Taylor injured, and was able to post a respectable performance before leaving in the third quarter with a concussion. The low-scoring game went into overtime, and did not end until LeSean McCoy rushed for a touchdown with under two minutes to go in the extra period. The Bills improved to 7–6 with the win.

Week 15: vs. Miami Dolphins

LeSean McCoy surpassed 10,000 rushing yards during the game, becoming just the 30th NFL running back to do so.

Week 16: at New England Patriots

A play near the end of the second quarter proved to be particularly controversial. Receiver Kelvin Benjamin caught a pass in the closing seconds of the second quarter that was initially ruled a touchdown by the on-field officials; however, the league's replay official, Alberto Riveron, determined that Benjamin did not have control of the ball until after his foot left the turf and Riveron overturned the touchdown, forcing the Bills to settle for a field goal. Bills owner Terrence Pegula indicated he would protest the decision. Though the first half was close, the Patriots outscored the Bills 24–3 in the second half, culminating in a 37–16 loss for Buffalo.

Week 17: at Miami Dolphins

The Bills started off the game up 10–0 by halftime and 19–0 by the time the Dolphins added a field goal. The Bills then fought off a comeback, including a fight that saw Jarvis Landry and Kenyan Drake get ejected. After a Miami touchdown that left them down six, history from the Bills–Dolphins game two weeks prior repeated itself: the Dolphins recovered an onside kick, then threw an interception with a minute to go to seal the game. With the win, Buffalo improved to 9–7, earning its first winning season since 2014.

At the end of the game, the Bills were still waiting for the final outcome between the Cincinnati Bengals and the Baltimore Ravens to determine their fates for the season. With 49 seconds left in that game, Bengals quarterback Andy Dalton threw a 49-yard go-ahead touchdown pass to Tyler Boyd on a 4th-and-12 play to go up 31–27. The Ravens were unable to respond on the following drive, sealing the win for the Bengals. The Bengals' victory ended the Ravens season with a 9–7 record. This allowed the Bills, also 9–7, to enter the playoffs with the tiebreaker over the Ravens, thus reaching the postseason for the first time in 17 years.

After the game, thousands of grateful Bills fans donated money to Dalton's personal charity. Most of the donations were in $17 increments in honor of the Bills breaking their 17-year playoff drought. In the first 72 hours after the game, over 11,000 people donated a combined over $250,000 to the Andy & Jordan Dalton Foundation, while Tyler Boyd's charity of choice, the Western Pennsylvania Youth Athletic Association, received $50,000 in donations from Bills fans. Relatedly, the Bills organization announced that they were sending Buffalo wings from Duff's Famous Wings to the Bengals organization, where they were consumed by residents of The Children's Home of Cincinnati. Retired punter Brian Moorman, who punted for the Bills through most of the 17-year playoff drought, also saw an uptick in $17 donations to his charity, the P.U.N.T. Foundation, which has extensive operations in Western New York.

As a result of Buffalo making it into the NFL playoffs for the first time since 1999, ending the longest active playoff drought in all of North American professional sports, the Cleveland Browns then held the longest NFL postseason drought, 15 seasons at the time and eventually 17 seasons until they reached the playoffs in 2020. MLB's Seattle Mariners then held the longest such drought in all North American sports at 17 seasons.

Standings

Division

Conference

Postseason

Schedule

Game summaries

AFC Wild Card Playoffs: at (3) Jacksonville Jaguars

The Bills were looking to win their first playoff game since 1995, as they faced the #3-seeded Jacksonville Jaguars, another team that has recently ended a lengthy playoff drought. Despite taking a 3–0 lead shortly before halftime on a kick by Steven Hauschka, the Jaguars would rally for the victory in a hard-fought defensive game, only sealing the victory with an interception by Jalen Ramsey on the Bills' final drive.

References

External links
 Official Website

Bills
Buffalo Bills seasons
Buffalo Bills